Freddy Mamani Silvestre (born 1 November 1971) is a Bolivian self-taught architect noted for his development of the Neo-Andean architectural style. His work is most associated with the city of El Alto and with the new social class of upwardly mobile indigenous Bolivians.

Mamani was born in Catavi and received his degrees from the Universidad Mayor de San Andres and Universidad Boliviana de Informática.

Regarding Mamani's architectural style, Italian architect Elisabetta Andreoli, author of "Andean Architecture of Bolivia", once explained that "some of the forms have been taken out of Andean art. The Tiwanacotas used a language of civilization in their forms: textiles, ceramics, and architectural ruins. Mamani uses the Andean cross, the diagonal juxtaposition of the planes, the duplicity, the repetition, the circle, which makes all this a stylisation theme, that is its source."

References

Further reading
 La arquitectura de Freddy Mamani Silvestre by Elisabetta Andreoli and Ligia D'Andrea (La Paz: El Alto, 2013)

1971 births
Living people
Bolivian people of Aymara descent
Bolivian architects
21st-century architects